Pomorzany is a municipal neighbourhood of the city of Szczecin, Poland situated on the left bank of Oder river, south of the Szczecin Old Town. It borders Gumieńce to the west, Turzyn to the northwest, Nowe Miasto to the north, Międzyodrze-Wyspa Pucka to the east, and Gmina Kołbaskowo (Ustowo village) to the south. As of January 2011 it had a population of 21,957.

Before 1945 it was called Pommerensdorf.

History 
The first traces of human activity in the area of today's Pomorzany date from the late Neolithic period. The stabilization of the settlement in this area occurred in the 8th century. The village (under the name of Pomerenstorp) was first mentioned in 1253 in document of Barnim I, Duke of Pomerania.

The northern part of Pomorzany (German: Pommerensdorfer Anlagen) was incorporated into the city in 1864, while the southern part in 1939, during the creation of Groß-Stettin (lit. Great City of Stettin), when neighbouring municipalities were amalgamated into Stettin.

During World War II, the Germans opened and operated seven forced labor camps in the district, for prisoners of various nationalities, including Poles, Yugoslavs and Russians. Many prisoners died in the camps. Allied air raids destroyed many residential buildings and factories.

The suburb was eventually incorporated into Szczecin on 5 July 1945.

In 2007, a monument to the victims of the local Nazi German forced labour camps from World War II was erected, unveiled by one of its survivors, Florian Nowacki.

Economy
The Bosman brewery is located in Pomorzany.

Gallery

Notes

References 

Pomorzany